Callisphyris is a genus of beetles in the family Cerambycidae, containing the following species:

 Callisphyris apicicornis Fairmaire & Germain, 1859
 Callisphyris crassus Barriga & Peña, 1994
 Callisphyris ficheti Barriga & Peña, 1994
 Callisphyris fritzi Cerda, 1968
 Callisphyris leptopus Philippi, 1859
 Callisphyris macropus Newman, 1840
 Callisphyris molorchoides (Guérin-Méneville, 1838)
 Callisphyris odyneroides Fairmaire & Germain, 1864
 Callisphyris pepsioides Barriga & Peña, 1994
 Callisphyris rufiventer Philippi, 1859

References

Necydalinae